Nordstrand was an Amt ("collective municipality") in the district of Nordfriesland, in Schleswig-Holstein, Germany. Its seat was in Nordstrand. In January 2008, it was merged with the Ämter Friedrichstadt, Hattstedt and Treene to form the Amt Nordsee-Treene.

The Amt Nordstrand consisted of the following municipalities:

Elisabeth-Sophien-Koog 
Nordstrand

Former Ämter in Schleswig-Holstein